The 1982 Wailea Pro Tennis Classic, also known as the Hawaii Open, was a men's tennis tournament played an outdoor hard courts in Maui, Hawaii, in the United States that was part of the 1982 Volvo Grand Prix circuit. It was the ninth edition of the tournament and was held from September 27 through October 3, 1982. Unseeded John Fitzgerald won the singles title.

Finals

Singles
 John Fitzgerald defeated  Brian Teacher 6–2, 6–3
 It was Fitzgerald's 1st singles title of the year and the 2nd of his career.

Doubles
 Eliot Teltscher /  Mike Cahill defeated  Francisco González /  Bernard Mitton 6–4, 6–4

References

Wailea Pro Tennis Classic
Wailea Pro Tennis Classic
Wailea Pro Tennis Classic
Wailea Pro Tennis Classic
Wailea Pro Tennis Classic
Hawaii Open